Gorazan-eOlya (also Romanized as Gorāzān-e‘Olyā) is a village in Howmeh Rural District, in the Central District of Gilan-e Gharb County, Kermanshah Province, Iran. At the 2006 census, its population was 212, in 49 families.

References 

Populated places in Gilan-e Gharb County